The 8th Jagran Film Festival is organized in 16 cities of India namely, Delhi, Kanpur, Lucknow, Allahabad, Varanasi, Patna, Dehradun, Ranchi, Jamshedpur, Bhopal, Indore, Hisar, Ludhiana, Meerut, Raipur, and Mumbai. This edition of the festival will showcase 185 films from all around the world. The festival is an initiative of Jagran Prakashan Group, a publishing house listed on the Bombay Stock Exchange and the National Stock Exchange of India, aimed at promoting the appreciation of the cinematic art beyond the major metropolitan cities of India to smaller towns. The 8th Jagran Film Festival was held from July 1 to September 24, 2017. The first edition of Jagran Film Festival was held in the year 2010.

Jury

Indian Showcase Jury
The following people were on the jury for the Indian Features section:

 Sudhir Mishra, Director and Screenwriter
 Divya Dutta, Indian Actress
 Sunny Joseph, Director and Cinematographer
 Sankalp Meshram, Director, Producer, Writer and Editor
 Harmeet Singh, Music Director

Jagran Shorts Jury
The following people were on the jury for Jagran Shorts section:

 Barry John, Indian Theatre Director and Teacher
 Makarand Deshpande, Actor, Writer and Director
 Aarti Chhabria, Indian Actress

Cinema Of The Sellers Jury

The following people were on the jury for Cinema of the Sellers section:
 Sonal Dabral, Scriptwriter, Chairman and CCO of DDB Mudra Group (India)
 Kailash Surendranath, Director and Co-founder of Kailash Picture Company
 Raj Nair, Writer, CEO and CCO of Madison BMB
 Nima DT Namchu, CCO of Havas Worldwide  (India)
 Prasoon Pandey, Director and Co-founder of Corcoise Films

International Jury

The following people were on the jury for International Features section:
 Rahul Rawail, Film Director
 Rauf Ahmed, Journalist, Film Critic and Author
 Jainardhan Sathyan, Film Director, Producer and Editor

Official selections

Indian Showcase
This section is dedicated to the Indian Feature Films from all the regions of the country. The following films are under the Indian Feature section: 
A Billion Color Story  by P.Narasimhamurthy
Allama by T.S. Nagabharana
Amaraavati by B M Giriraj
Anaarkali of Aarah by Avinash Das
Angamaly Diaries by Lijo Jose Pellissery
Bareilly Ki Barfi by Ashwiny Iyer Tiwari
Charandas Chor by Shyam Maheshwari
Doctor Rakhmabai by Anant Mahadevan
Hindi Medium by Saket Chaudhary
Jolly LLB 2 by Subhash Kapoor
Kaabil by Sanjay Gupta
Kaatru Veliyidai by Mani Ratnam
Martin by Jeetendra Shikerkar
Messi by Riingo Banerjee
Mukti Bhawan by Shubhashish Bhutiani
Phillauri by Anshai Lal
Pink by Aniruddha Roy Chowdhury
Posto by Shiboprosad Mukherjee, Nandita Roy
Raees by Rahul Dholakia
Rama Rama Re by D. Sathyaprakash
Shaanu-The Optimist by K. N. T. Sastry
Shivaay by Ajay Devgn
Sonata by Aparna Sen
Super Singh by Anurag Singh
The Ghazi Attack by Sankalp
Toilet:  Ek Prem Katha by Shree Narayan Singh
Trapped by Vikramaditya Motwane

World Panorama
This section is dedicated to Foreign Feature Films. It includes feature films from different countries. The following films are under World Panorama section:
Blue Silence by Bülent Öztürk
Corporate by Nicolas Silhol
Dark Blue Girl by Mascha Schilinski
Pretty Far From Okay (Einmal Bitte Alles) by Helena Hufnagel
 The Alley (El Callejόn) by Caro Duarte
Back to 97 (Em 97 Era Assim) by Zeca Brito
Inner Court (Foro ĺntimo) by Ricardo Mehedff
Golden Five by Goran Trenchovski
Point Of View (‘Im Auge Des Betrachters’) by Otwin Karl Biernat
The Desert Bride(La Novia Del Desierto) by Cecilia Atán 
Last Christmas by Christiano Pahler
The Red Lands (Le Terre Rosse) by Giovanni Brancale
Napoli Underground by Salvatore Polizzi
Purple Horizons by Olgun Ӧzdemir
Side B by David Yánez
Still Summer by Yoon Hyung Chul
The Black Prince by Kavi Raz
Wood For The Trees (Vor Lauter Bäumen) by Pablo Callisaya
Rage (Wściekłość) by Michał Węgrzyn

Special Screening
The following films are under the Special Screening section:
Antareen by Monjul Baruah
Eh Janam Tumhare Lekhe by Harjit Singh
Gurgaon by Shanker Raman
Moh Maya Money by Munish Bhardwaj
Naam Shabana by Shivam Nair
Tope (The Bait) by Buddhadeb Dasgupta

Homage
The 8th edition of Jagran film festival pays homage to some of the veteran actors by screening their popular films. The following films were screened under the Homage section:
"Vinod Khanna"- Achanak by Gulzar
"Om Puri"- Dharavi by Sudhir Mishra
"Reema Lagoo"- Rui Ka Bojh by Subhash Agarwal
"Jeanne Moreau"- Jules Et Jim by François Truffaut

Awards
The following prizes were awarded: 
 Best Make Up– Ruhee Bindra for “Raees”
 Best Costume– Purnima Oak for “Doctor Rakhmabai”
 Best Set Design– Aman Vidhate for “Doctor Rakhmabai”
 Best Sound Re-Recordist– Anish John for “Trapped”
 Best Cinematography – K.U. Mohanan for “Raees”
 Best Editing – Nitin Baid for Raees
 Best Screenplay– Padmakumar Narasimhamurthy for “A Billion Color Story”
 Best Background Score – Ram Sampath for “Raees”
 Best Lyrics – Tanveer Ghazi for “Pink”
 Best Singer Female – Rekha Bhardwaj for “Anaarkali of Aarah”
 Best Singer Male – Sukhwinder Singh for “Jolly LLB 2”
 Best Music Director – Rohit Sharma for “Anaarkali of Aarah”
 Best Debut Director – Avinash Das for “Anaarkali of Aarah”
 Best Debut Director – Shubhashish Bhutiani for “Mukti Bhawan”
 Best Supporting Actor Female – Seema Bhargava for “Bareilly Ki Barfi”
 Best Supporting Actor Male – Saurabh Shukla for “Jolly LLB 2”
 Special Jury Award – Taapsee Pannu, Kirti Kulhari, Andrea Tariang for “Pink”
 Best Actor Female – Swara Bhaskar for “Anaarkali of Aarah”
 Best Actor Male – Irrfan Khan for “Hindi Medium”
Special Mention – Adil Hussain for “Mukti Bhawan” 
 Special Mention – “Dhruva Padmakumar” for “A Billion Color Story (film)|A Billion Color Story”
 Best Director – Aniruddha Roy Chowdhury for “Pink”
 Cinema Of The Seller Awards
Gold – McCann Erickson for “Live Love Laugh Foundation - Dobara Poocho”
Silver – Taproot Dents for “Adidas – Odds”
Bronze – BBDO Worldwide for “Mirinda - Release the Pressure”
 Best Short Film – Slimane Bounia for “Burning (Celui Qui Brule)”
 Special Jury Award – Rahul Chittella for “Azaad”
 Special Jury Award – Saurabh Tyagi for “Mazjhabi Laddu”
 Best Foreign Feature Film – Goran Trenchovski for “Golden Five”
 Best Feature Film – Subhash Kapoor for “Jolly LLB 2”
 Special Jury Award – Zeca Brito for “Back to 97 (Em 97 Era Assim)”
 Special Mention – “Zeynep Sevi Yilmaz for “Purple Horizons”
 Rajnigandha Achievers Award – Nawazuddin Siddiqui
 Special Contribution to Cinematic Art – Pravin Bhatt
 Icon Of Indian Cinema – Shabana Azmi

References

Film festivals in India
2017 film festivals